Katy Munger, who has also written under the names Gallagher Gray and Chaz McGee, is an American writer known for writing the Casey Jones and Hubbert & Lil series.  She is a former reviewer for the Washington Post.

Biography
Born in Honolulu, Hawaii, she soon moved to Raleigh, North Carolina, growing up with her five brothers and sisters. She describes herself as a "southern belle" and says that Casey Jones was influenced by her own character.

Munger began her writing career by publishing under a name other than her own, namely Gallagher Gray. Under this pseudonym, she wrote four books in the Hubbert & Lil series in the 1990s. During the late '90s into the early 2000s, Munger wrote the Casey Jones series. However, there was then a long break in her output until she began a new series in 2009, the Dead Detective series, under a new pseudonym, Chaz McGee. She also obtained a new publisher for the series.

Tart Noir
Munger's genre of writing is described as Tart Noir, which is a subsection of crime fiction created in part by Munger. In publicizing the genre, she has teamed up with the three other creators and writers, Sparkle Hayter, Laura Lippman, and Lauren Henderson, for book signings and other venues. It is believed that the authors first met and befriended each other by "getting drunk together at writers conferences". Not long afterwards, the four worked together in creating and promoting their new website, titled Tartcity.com. Munger and a collection of 19 other Tart Noir writers also came together to write an anthology of original stories in 2002.

Awards
 2002, American Crime Writers League's "Ellen Nehr Award"

Works

Hubbert & Lil series (as Gallagher Gray)
 Hubbert & Lil: Partners In Crime (1991)
 A Cast Of Killers (1992)
 Death Of A Dream Maker (1995)
 Motive For Murder (1996)

Casey Jones series
 Legwork (1997)
 Out of Time (1998)
 Money to Burn (1999)
 Bad to the Bone (2000)
 Better Off Dead (2001)
 Bad Moon on the Rise (2009)
Fire and Rain (2019)

Dead Detective series (as Chaz McGee/Katy Munger)
 Desolate Angel (2009)
 Angel Interrupted (2010)
 Angel of Darkness (2011)
 Angel Among Us (2012)

References

Further reading

External links
 Katy Munger's Official Website

1956 births
Living people
20th-century American novelists
21st-century American novelists
20th-century American women writers
21st-century American women writers
20th-century pseudonymous writers
21st-century pseudonymous writers
American crime fiction writers
American women novelists
Writers from Honolulu
Writers from Raleigh, North Carolina
University of North Carolina at Chapel Hill alumni
Women crime fiction writers
Novelists from Hawaii
Novelists from North Carolina
Pseudonymous women writers